Hatice Kübra İlgün (born 1 January 1993) is a Turkish taekwondo practitioner. She has won a silver medal at the 2017 World Taekwondo Championships in the featherweight division.

Sport career
Hatice Kübra İlgün left it until the final second of her under-57 kilograms featherweight final to win the World Taekwondo Grand Prix in Chiba in September 2019.

A high, round kick to the head of Morocco's Nada Laraaj turned a 3-2 deficit into a 4-3 winning margin for the 26-year-old Turkish fighter whose career was gathering huge momentum up to the point where competition had to be held up because of the 2020 coronavirus pandemic.
İlgün started taekwondo 14-years-ago though a family contact.

"My advantages are that my legs are very long, and I am strong and slim," she said. "And I work hard."

Her promise in the sport was soon evident as she earned second place in the senior under-49 kg event at the Dutch Open aged 16. The following year, she was under-57 kg bronze medallist at the European Under-21 Championships in Chisinau and senior titles soon followed in the Turkish, Ukraine and Moldova Open events.

In 2017, she took another significant step-up as she won under-57 kg silver at the World Championships in Muju, losing 7-5 to South Korea's Lee Ah-reum, who had beaten Britain's Olympic champion Jade Jones in the semi-final.

Before the year was over she had won gold at the Summer Universiade in Taipei, and she followed up by earning her first Grand Prix title in Rabat.

At the 2018 European Championships in Kazan she added another significant medal to her collection as she earned silver, losing to Jones in the final.

In 2019, she produced a series of results that bettered for consistency anything she had done before.

Her Chiba win was preceded by silver at the Rome Grand Prix, and followed by bronze at the Sofia Grand Prix and a silver in the Grand Prix Final in Moscow.

She continued into 2020 in the same dominant vein, winning the Fujairah Open and WT Presidents Cup - Europe in Helsingborg before taking bronze at the German Open.

Qualification for the next Olympics has been amply secured.

"I am really hard working," she told World Taekwondo. "And I really want to be there."

A medal at Tokyo would be a life-changing achievement. Turkey awards successful European, World or Olympic medal-winning athletes with monetary compensation and post-career coaching positions.

"That is good for building my future," she added. "But I will fight under the Turkish national flag. That is more important to me than money."

Hatice Kübra Ilgün managed to win 8-6 in the final for third place against Alizadeh Zenoorin Kimia, the fighter of the Olympic Refugee Team (EOR), in the women’s category of – 57 kg during the Tokyo 2020 Olympic Games. İlgün won the first round 3-2, and continued her form in the second round with a 2-0 win, taking the total score to 4-3. İlgün clinched the last round 4-3 and won the match with an 8-6 score.

She won the gold medal in the women's 57 kg event at the 2022 Mediterranean Games held in Oran, Algeria. She won one of the bronze medals in the women's featherweight event at the 2022 World Taekwondo Championships held in Guadalajara, Mexico.

Tournament record

References

External links 
 

Living people
1993 births
Turkish female taekwondo practitioners
Universiade medalists in taekwondo
Universiade gold medalists for Turkey
World Taekwondo Championships medalists
European Taekwondo Championships medalists
Medalists at the 2017 Summer Universiade
Taekwondo practitioners at the 2020 Summer Olympics
Olympic taekwondo practitioners of Turkey
Olympic bronze medalists for Turkey
Olympic medalists in taekwondo
Medalists at the 2020 Summer Olympics
Mediterranean Games medalists in taekwondo
Mediterranean Games silver medalists for Turkey
Competitors at the 2013 Mediterranean Games
Competitors at the 2022 Mediterranean Games
Mediterranean Games gold medalists for Turkey
21st-century Turkish women
Islamic Solidarity Games medalists in taekwondo
Islamic Solidarity Games competitors for Turkey